The zona reticularis (sometimes, reticulate zone) is the innermost layer of the adrenal cortex, lying deep to the zona fasciculata and superficial to the adrenal medulla. The cells are arranged cords that project in different directions giving a net-like appearance (L. reticulum - net).

Cells in the zona reticularis produce precursor androgens including dehydroepiandrosterone (DHEA) and androstenedione from cholesterol. DHEA is further converted to DHEA-sulfate via a sulfotransferase, SULT2A1. These precursors are not further converted in the adrenal cortex if the cells lack 17β-Hydroxysteroid dehydrogenase. Instead, they are released into the blood stream and taken up in the testis and ovaries to produce testosterone and the estrogens respectively.

ACTH partially regulates adrenal androgen secretion, also CRH.

In humans the reticularis layer does contain 17α-hydroxylase; this hydroxylates pregnenolone, which is then converted to cortisol by a mixed function oxidase.  In rodents, the lack of 17α-hydroxylase results in the synthesis of corticosterone instead of cortisol as in the human.

References

External links
 
  - "Adrenal Gland"

Adrenal gland